Scanzoni may refer to:
 Friedrich Wilhelm Scanzoni von Lichtenfels (1821–1891), a Bohemia-born German gynecologist and obstetrician
  (1885–1977), grandson of Friedrich Wilhelm Scanzoni von Lichtenfels
 Gustav Scanzoni von Lichtenfels (1855–1924), German general of World War I, active in Attack at Fromelles
 Letha Dawson Scanzoni (born 1935), an independent scholar, author, and editor

Italian-language surnames